The Mt. Pilgrim African Baptist Church (also known as the Mt. Pilgrim Baptist Church) is a historic church in Milton, Florida. It is located at the junction of Alice and Clara Streets.

On May 29, 1992, it was added to the U.S. National Register of Historic Places. In 1989, the church was listed in A Guide to Florida's Historic Architecture, published by the University of Florida Press.

References

External links
 Santa Rosa County listings at National Register of Historic Places
 Florida's Office of Cultural and Historical Programs
 Santa Rosa County listings at Florida's Office of Cultural and Historical Programs
 Mt. Pilgrim African Baptist Church

Baptist churches in Florida
National Register of Historic Places in Santa Rosa County, Florida
Churches on the National Register of Historic Places in Florida
Churches in Santa Rosa County, Florida